Patrick Lancaster Gardiner, FBA (1922–1997) was a British academic philosopher and a Fellow of Magdalen College, Oxford.

Biography

Gardiner was born in Chelsea, London, on 17 March 1922. His father was Clive Gardiner, a landscape artist and principal of Goldsmiths College; his mother was Lilian Lancaster, an artist and a pupil of Walter Sickert. His paternal grandfather was Alfred George Gardiner, editor of The Daily News. His younger brother was the architect Stephen Gardiner. He was educated at Westminster School, and then received a First in history from Christ Church, Oxford. After Army service in Italy, North Africa and Austria, he returned to Oxford for a second B.A., in PPE (politics, philosophy and economics).

He was appointed to Wadham College, Oxford (1949), and then St Antony's College, Oxford (1952). His first published book was The Nature of Historical Explanation in 1952 In 1958 he became a Fellow of Magdalen College, where he remained, becoming an Emeritus Fellow in 1989.

He married Susan Booth (1934–2006) in 1955 and had two daughters.

Academic work
He is best known for his studies of Schopenhauer published in 1963 and Kierkegaard in 1988.

According to his obituary in The Times by Richard Wollheim, his most important contribution to philosophy was to reawaken interest in German Idealism at a time (the 1960s) when it was largely neglected in British philosophy departments. His books on Schopenhauer and Kierkegaard were "models of how to respect the extremity of an author's thinking without condoning it" and "recaptured a whole philosophical terrain for the sophisticated reader".

Bibliography

Books
The Nature of Historical Explanation (1952) Oxford University Press
Schopenhauer (1963) Penguin Books
Kierkegaard (1988) Oxford University Press
The Philosophy of History (Editor, 1974), Oxford Readings in Philosophy
Nineteenth-century philosophy (Editor, 1969) The Free Press, New York

Articles

Poetry
Oxford Poetry 1947 (two poems). Edited by Martin Starkie and Roy Macnab. Basil Blackwell, Oxford, 1947.
Oxford Poetry 1949 (one poem). Edited by Kingsley Amis and James Michie. Basil Blackwell, Oxford, 1949.

References

1922 births
1997 deaths
20th-century British philosophers
20th-century British historians
Kierkegaard scholars
Scholars of modern philosophy
Fellows of Magdalen College, Oxford
Fellows of the British Academy